In Europe, positive action 
are measures which are targeted at protected groups in order to enable or encourage members of those groups to overcome or minimise disadvantage; or to meet the different needs of the
protected group; or to enable or encourage persons in protected groups to participate in an activity. In the United Kingdom in the Equality Act 2010 ss 158-159, the term is used in the context of employment to allow selection of a candidate from an "under-represented" group, so long as he or she is no less than equally qualified compared to another potential candidate that is not from the under-represented group.

European law
Treaty on the Functioning of the European Union Article 157(4)
Kalanke v Freie Hansestadt Bremen [1995] IRLR 660, [1996] ECR I-03051 (C-450/93)
Marschall v Land Nordrhein Westfalen [1997] ECR I-06363 (C-409/95)
Re Badeck’s application [2001] 2 CMLR 6 (C-158/97)
Abrahamsson and Anderson v Fogelqvist [2000] ECR I-05539 (C-407/98)

See also
EU law
UK employment discrimination law
Equal Opportunity
Social Equality

Labour law
Affirmative action